The Girl in the Pullman is a 1927 American silent comedy film directed by Erle C. Kenton and starring Marie Prevost, Harrison Ford, and Franklin Pangborn.

Cast

Preservation status
Prints of The Girl in the Pullman are held in the French archive Centre national du cinéma et de l'image animée in Fort de Bois-d'Arcy and the UCLA Film and Television Archive.

References

Bibliography
 Munden, Kenneth White. The American Film Institute Catalog of Motion Pictures Produced in the United States, Part 1. University of California Press, 1997.

External links

1927 films
1927 comedy films
Silent American comedy films
Films directed by Erle C. Kenton
American silent feature films
1920s English-language films
Pathé Exchange films
American black-and-white films
1920s American films